Farm to Market Road 1472 (FM 1472) is a farm-to-market road in the U.S. state of Texas that connects the industrial area of Laredo to the Laredo–Colombia Solidarity International Bridge, and then runs roughly parallel to the Rio Grande into rural Webb County. In the urban sections of Laredo, it is a six-lane route known locally as Mines Road.

Route description
The southern terminus of FM 1472 is in Laredo, at IH 35 exit #4. The route travels to the north and crosses I-69W/US 59/Loop 20 just east of the World Trade International Bridge. It then takes a northwesterly route, paralleling the Rio Grande. It has a junction with SH 255, the former Camino Colombia Toll Road, near the Laredo city limits. The route continues through unincorporated Webb County before reaching the end of its designation north of Carricitos Creek. The unimproved roadway continues as Eagle Pass Road, which becomes the paved FM 1021 after crossing into Maverick County.

History
A previous route numbered FM 1472 was designated on July 20, 1948 from US 82 in Crosbyton to Wake School in Crosby County. This route was cancelled and combined with FM 28 on November 1, 1954.

The portion of the route between IH 35 and SH 255 was officially redesignated Urban Road 1472 (UR 1472) on June 27, 1995 due to the growth of the Laredo urban area and the construction of the Laredo–Colombia Solidarity International Bridge northwest of the city.
The designation of this segment reverted to FM 1472 with the elimination of the Urban Road system on November 15, 2018.

Major intersections

References

1472
Transportation in Webb County, Texas
Highways in Laredo, Texas